Maurice Roy Ridley (25 January 1890, in Orcheston St Mary – 12 June 1969) was a writer and poet, Fellow and Chaplain of Balliol College, Oxford. He was also a visiting professor at Bowdoin under the auspices of the Tallman Foundation, and shortly thereafter.

Career
Ridley was educated at Clifton College and Balliol College, Oxford. From 1920 to 1945 he was a Fellow and Tutor of Balliol. Ridley spent 1930–1 as a visiting professor at Bowdoin College under the auspices of the Tallman Foundation. He was a lecturer at Bedford College, University of London, from 1948. He earned a Doctorate of Humane Letters therein.

In popular culture
Dorothy L. Sayers based the physical description of her fictional character Lord Peter Wimsey (the archetypal British gentleman detective and aristocratic super sleuth extraordinaire) on that of Ridley after seeing him read his Newdigate Prize-winning poem "Oxford" at the Encaenia ceremony in July 1913.

Awards 
 Newdigate Prize, 1913

Works

References

1890 births
1969 deaths
Bowdoin College faculty
Alumni of Balliol College, Oxford
Fellows of Balliol College, Oxford
20th-century Church of England clergy
Academics of Bedford College, London
Bowdoin College people